Spirit Bay was an aboriginal family television show of 13 half-hour episodes that aired on CBC Television and TVOntario from 1982 to 1987. The show focuses on the lives of townsfolk on an Ojibwe reservation town near MacDiarmid, Ontario. Here, the residents have adapted to white society while retaining traditional links to the land through fishing, trapping and hunting. The show details the spiritual kinship between Spirit Bay families, nature, and modern life on the reserve from a young person's viewpoint. Being the first true aboriginal television series, it set the stage for all other native Canadian programming thereafter (such as The Rez, North of 60 and Moccasin Flats), and paved the way for many famous First Nations, Canadian actors. Episodes were rebroadcast in the United States on the Disney Channel.

Notable actors from the series
Trevor 'Tre' Smith as "Rabbit"
Graham Greene as Pete "Baba" Green
Tom Jackson as Will Littlebear
Tantoo Cardinal as Rabbit's foster mother Annie
Gary Farmer as Hack's uncle Cheemo
Shirley Cheechoo as Elton and Tonka's mother
Monique Mojica as Mavis and Hack's mother Gloria
Margo Kane as the school teacher Mrs. Walker

Lesser known elder actors included:
Gladys Taylor as Teawash
Colleen Loucks as Aunt Lily Shebagabow
Ron Cook as Baba Shebagabow (Minnow and Tafia's father)
Blake Debassige as Annie's husband Ron
Doris Linklater as Pete's wife Connie Green
Peter Krantz as Coleman (Hack's Uncle)

Noted elder aboriginal actor George Clutesi (who played Old Bernard) appeared in two episodes. In one he helps Hack deal with the importance of an ancestral medicine bag, and in the other he teaches Tafia the true value of art.

Child actors from the series

One of the child stars of the show was Trevor Smith, who played Rabbit, a young teen who comes to the reserve from the city after he is adopted. He was the only actor in the series who was not of native origin. Other child actors on the show included:

Cynthia Debassige as Tafia Shebagabow
Diane Debassige as Mavis
Lance Migwans as Hack
Eugene Thompson as Minnow Shebagabow
Liza Haldane as Lenore Green
Mark Bruder as Elton (older brother of Tonka)
Kim Boucher as Rose
Cheri Maracle as Ruth
Sarah Williams as Sadie Green
Julie Beaulieu as Mary

Theme music

The theme song was penned by Canadian music and acting legend Buffy Sainte Marie.

Filming location

The show was shot on location in MacDiarmid, Ontario on Lake Nipigon at the Rocky Bay First Nation. A modern school in Rocky Bay has been named the Spirit Bay School after the series. As well, the new community gas station has also been named "Spirit Bay".

Episode titles and synopsis

A Time to Be Brave- Tafia has to overcome her fear of trains to help her father survive in the dead of winter.
Rabbit Goes Fishing- Ralph (aka Rabbit), a young orphan from the city, is aloof and unfriendly when he arrives in Spirit Bay. But the kind Cheemo discovers that the boy's false bravado stems from fear of rejection he has experienced in many foster homes. Cheemo convinces Ralph on a fishing trip that he is with his own people and at home.
A Real Kid- Rabbit finds out that his foster mother, Annie, is pregnant, and he runs away for fear he will be ignored.
The Blueberry Bicycle- Elton uses his money to get spare parts for his bike from elder Teawash, and by doing so learns a valuable lesson in the town's bike race.
Words on a Page- Lenore writes a story that could win her a scholarship in the city, but her father is reluctant to let her enter it in a contest.
Circle of Life- The kids find a native skeleton on an island. When a museum comes and take the bones to Thunder Bay the community is outraged; however, they find a way to bring them back for a proper ceremonial burial.
Hack's Choice- Hack's uncle Cole, a former WHA hockey pro, comes back to Spirit Bay to try to weasel him out of his father's medicine bag so he can sell it to collectors.
Rabbit Pulls His Weight- Rabbit literally pulls his weight when he helps out a pilot whose plane has crashed back in the snowy bush.
Hot News- Mavis and her cousin Mary want to write an article about an old Indian recipe, but end up fighting with one another in their canoe while a dangerous forest fire lingers nearby.
Big Save- Spirit Bay's broomball team gets stranded in a blizzard and Rose has to use her survival know-how to save the kids.
Dancing Feathers- Tafia is taken to Toronto where she learns the importance of the annual pow wow festival.
The Pride of Spirit Bay- Tafia learns the value of true art from her elders.
Water Magic- Cheemo, the fisherman, must pay $1500 by the end of the week, or lose his boat. Teawash, the wise old woman, warns him and his helpers to remember to leave something for the Memagwasis- the little people. The boys ridicule Teawash, and later scoff when Cheemo gives back fish to the spirit of the lake.

External links

 Internet Movie Database
 Spirit Bay TV Series
 An episode for viewing

First Nations television series
Northern Ontario in fiction
CBC Television original programming
1982 Canadian television series debuts
1987 Canadian television series endings
Television shows set in Ontario
1980s Canadian drama television series